Interlachen is a town in Putnam County, Florida, United States. The population was 1,403 at the 2010 census. The town is part of the Palatka Micropolitan Statistical Area and was named by a gentleman named Mr. Berkelmann from Germany who lived in Interlachen when the town was being incorporated. He said that since the town was located between 2 lakes and there were more than 28 lakes in the town, Interlachen, which means "between the lakes" would be an appropriate name.

Geography

Interlachen is located at  (29.622709, –81.894680).

Demographics

As of the census of 2000, there were 1,475 people, 537 households, and 381 families residing in the town. The racial makeup of the town was 78.44% White, 6.10% African American, 0.88% Native American, 0.27% Asian, 11.19% from other races, and 3.12% from two or more races. Hispanic or Latino of any race were 21.83% of the population.

There were 537 households, out of which 33.9% had children under the age of 18 living with them, 52.7% were married couples living together, 13.8% had a female householder with no husband present, and 28.9% were non-families. 23.8% of all households were made up of individuals, and 11.2% had someone living alone who was 65 years of age or older.  The average household size was 2.75 and the average family size was 3.28.

In the town, the population was spread out, with 30.9% under the age of 18, 7.5% from 18 to 24, 23.9% from 25 to 44, 22.9% from 45 to 64, and 14.8% who were 65 years of age or older.  The median age was 36 years. For every 100 females, there were 93.1 males.  For every 100 females age 18 and over, there were 91.5 males.

The median income for a household in the town was $25,962, and the median income for a family was $34,375. Males had a median income of $24,886 versus $17,841 for females. The per capita income for the town was $12,920.  About 26.9% of families and 27.5% of the population were below the poverty line, including 32.9% of those under age 18 and 18.3% of those age 65 or over.

Education

 Robert H. Jenkins, Jr. Elementary School (formerly known as Interlachen Elementary School until 2021)
 Interlachen High School (merged with C.H. Price Middle School and reverted back to previous name of Interlachen Jr.-Sr. High School in 2021)

History

From 1852 until 1892, the area was known as "Blue Pond". When the Florida Southern Railway came through Interlachen in the 1870s, the area opened up to settlers. The town developed economically as a winter vacation spot and citrus growing area. The town of Interlachen was incorporated in 1888. The Hastings Seed House was organized in 1889, moving to Atlanta, Georgia ten years later. In 1891, the Interlachen Town Hall burned down. Another was built to replace it the following year and it still stands—now housing a museum—and is also used as a place for presentations for certain festivals. When the Great Freeze hit in 1895, the town's tourism and citrus sharply declined. In 1895, Interlachen Academy was built; it is the oldest wooden school house in continuous use in Florida, which now serves as the location of the Interlachen High School's JROTC program. In 1926, Interlachen first gained electricity and Route 14, now State Road 20, was constructed through Interlachen. In the 1930s a train came through the town every two hours. But in 1969, with the decline of railroads, the Interlachen Railroad depot was razed. Currently, a caboose sits in the middle of the town as a reminder of the tourist haven the town once was.

References

External links

Town of Interlachen

Towns in Putnam County, Florida
Towns in Florida